In social choice theory, Anonymity is a basic requirement of a social choice rule. It says that the rule does not discriminate apriori between different voters. In other words, the rule returns the same outcome (whatever this outcome may be) if the vector of votes is permuted arbitrarily.

Anonymous rules 
Most voting rules are anonymous by design. For example, plurality voting is anonymous, since only counts the number of votes received by each candidates, regardless of who cast these votes. Similarly, the utilitarian rule and egalitarian rule are both anonymous, since the only consider the set of utilities, regardless of who these utilities belong to.

All rules using a secret ballot are anonymous, since they do not know which voter cast which vote. But the opposite is not true: a committee can use non-secret ballot, and still use an anonymous voting rule.

Non-anonymous rules 
Weighted voting rules are non-anonymous, as they give some voters a higher weight than others, for example, due to their expertise or entitlement.

Another example of a non-anonymous voting rule is plurality voting with the additional rule that, in case of a tie, the option preferred by the chair is selected.

In general, whenever different agents may have different entitlements, a non-anonymous rule makes sense.

See also 

 Neutrality (social choice) - a related requirement, saying that the rule does not discriminate apriori between different candidates.

References 

Social choice theory